Bramshott and Ludshott Commons is a  biological Site of Special Scientific Interest near Grayshott in Hampshire. It is part of Wealden Heaths Phase II Special Protection Area. 

The site has large areas of heath which are dominated by heather, bell heather, common gorse and dwarf gorse. There are also woodland areas with ancient trees, with at least 87 taxa of epiphytic lichens, most of which are associated with ancient woods and several of which are rare.

References

 
Sites of Special Scientific Interest in Hampshire
Special Protection Areas in England